Bourcart is a French surname. Notable people with the surname include:

 Jacques Bourcart (1891–1965), French oceanographer and geologist
 Jean-Christian Bourcart (born 1960), French photographer and filmmaker

French-language surnames